François Pithou (1543 – 25 January 1621) was a French lawyer and author.

He was a younger brother of Pierre Pithou and the twins Jean and Nicolas Pithou. His works are Glossarium ad libros capitularium (1588) and Traité de l'excommunication et de l'interdit, etc. (1587).

References 

 http://gso.gbv.de/DB=1.28/REL?PPN=004739280&RELTYPE=TT

External links
 

1621 deaths
French legal writers
16th-century French lawyers
16th-century French writers
16th-century male writers
1543 births
People from Troyes
French male non-fiction writers